Jenna Arrowsmith (born 5 May 1980) is a British former competitive figure skater in ladies' singles. She is a three-time British national champion and finished 24th at the 1995 World Championships. She was coached by Lesley Norfolk-Pearce  at the Swindon Ice Figure Club.

Programs

Results

References

British female single skaters
Scottish female single skaters
1980 births
Living people
Sportspeople from Edinburgh
Sportspeople from Swindon